The 2015 1000 Guineas Stakes was a horse race held at Newmarket Racecourse on Sunday 3 May 2015. It was the 202nd running of the 1000 Guineas.

The winner was Susan Magnier, Michael Tabor and Derrick Smith's Legatissimo, a British-bred bay filly trained in County Tipperary, Ireland by David Wachman and ridden by Ryan Moore. Legatissimo's victory was the first in the race for Wachman, the second for Moore and the third for the Magnier/Tabor/Smith partnership.

The contenders
The race attracted a field of thirteen runners, nine trained in the United Kingdom and four in Ireland: there were no challengers from continental Europe. Following the withdrawal of the ante-post favourite Found, the leading Irish contender was the Jim Bolger-trained Lucida, who had won the Rockfel Stakes in 2014 whilst the Aidan O'Brien stable was represented by the C. L. Weld Park Stakes winner Qualify. The County Tipperary stable of David Wachmann had two runners, Legatissimo (winner of a Listed race on her most recent appearance) and Queen Nefertiti. The British runners included Tiggy Wiggy who had been named the Champion Two-year-old Filly after wins in the Weatherbys Super Sprint, Lowther Stakes and Cheveley Park Stakes. The lightly-raced pair Redstart and Jellicle Ball, who had finished first and second ahead of Tiggy Wiggy in the Fred Darling Stakes were also in the field. The other runners included Fadhayyil (runner-up in the Rockfel Stakes), Osaila (Nell Gwyn Stakes), Malabar (Prestige Stakes) and the Godolphin representative Local Time, who had won her last six races including the UAE 1000 Guineas and the UAE Oaks. The field was completed by the Listed race winners Irish Rookie (Montrose Stakes) and Terror (Bosra Sham Stakes).

Lucida headed the betting at odds of 9/2 ahead of Legatissimo (13/2) with Fadhayyil and Jellicle Ball on 7/1. Next in the market were Osaila (15/2), Tiggy Wiggy (9/1) and Malabar (11/1).

The race
Redstart broke quickly and set the pace along the stands side from Tiggy Wigqy who raced in the centre of the course before moving over to join the main group. Local Time and  Queen Nefertiti and were among the leaders whilst Lucida and Legatissimo were towards the rear. Two furlongs out, as the fillies reached the cut-away, the race appeared to be wide-open, with all thirteen runners closely grouped. Lucida made rapid progress on the outside and overtook Tiggy Wiggy to take the lead approaching the final furlong, but Legatissimo quickly emerged as a serious challenger. The two Irish fillies drew away from the other runners, with Legatissimo prevailing by three quarters of a length. There was a gap of four and a half lengths back to Tiggy Wiggy who took third ahead of Malabar and Fadhayyil. The winning time of 1:34.60 was the second fastest in the history of the race and almost a second faster than Gleneagles ran in the 2000 Guineas on the same course a day earlier.

Race details
 Sponsor: QIPCO
 First prize: £232,511
 Surface: Turf
 Going: Good to Firm
 Distance: 8 furlongs
 Number of runners: 13
 Winner's time:1:34.60

Full result

 Abbreviations: nse = nose; nk = neck; shd = head; hd = head; dist = distance; UR = unseated rider; DSQ = disqualified; PU = pulled up

Winner's details
Further details of the winner, Legatissimo
 Foaled: 22 April 2012
 Country: United Kingdom
 Sire: Danehill Dancer; Dam: Yummy Mummy (Montjeu)
 Owner: Michael Tabor, Derrick Smith & Mrs John Magnier
 Breeder: Newsells Park Stud

References

 1000 Guineas
 2015
1000 Guineas
1000 Guineas
2010s in Suffolk